Stahlhofen is an Ortsgemeinde – a community belonging to a Verbandsgemeinde – in the Westerwaldkreis in Rhineland-Palatinate, Germany. It is not to be confused with Stahlhofen am Wiesensee, another community in the same district, but in the Verbandsgemeinde of Westerburg.

Geography

The community lies in the Westerwald south of Montabaur in the Nassau Nature Park. The community belongs to the Verbandsgemeinde of Montabaur, a kind of collective municipality. Its seat is in the like-named town.

History
In 1387, Stahlhofen had its first documentary mention.

Politics

Community council
The council is made up of 16 council members who were elected in a majority vote in a municipal election on 13 June 2004.

Coat of arms
The chapel in the community's arms symbolizes the age-old Wendelinuskapelle, which was replaced in the last century by the new building shown in the arms. The linden trees standing next to the chapel, which can be seen far into the surrounding countryside, are Stahlhofen's main landmark. The basalt columns stand for the rich basalt deposits the municipal area. The arms’ basic tincture, silver, and the chapel's tincture, red, are from the coat of arms formerly borne by the Electorate of Trier.

Economy and infrastructure

The nearest Autobahn interchange is Montabaur on the A 3 (Cologne–Frankfurt), some 6 km away. The nearest InterCityExpress stops are the railway stations at Montabaur on the Cologne-Frankfurt high-speed rail line and Koblenz on the Rechte Rheinstrecke.

References

External links
Stahlhofen 
Stahlhofen in the collective municipality’s Web pages 

Municipalities in Rhineland-Palatinate
Westerwaldkreis